Viðar is an Icelandic given name and surname. Notable people with the name include:

Atli Viðar Björnsson (born 1980), Icelandic footballer
Viðar Örn Kjartansson (born 1990), Icelandic footballer
Jórunn Viðar (born 1918), Icelandic pianist and composer
Viðar Helgi Guðjohnsen (born 1983), Icelandic television personality

See also
 Víðarr

Icelandic masculine given names